Siedliska  is a village in the administrative district of Gmina Koniusza, within Proszowice County, Lesser Poland Voivodeship, in southern Poland.

It is located on route 776. Its name means 'habitat'.

References

Siedliska